Ammodytes is a genus of sand lances native to the northern oceans.

Species
There are currently 8 recognized species in this genus:
 Ammodytes americanus DeKay, 1842 (American sand lance)
 Ammodytes dubius J. C. H. Reinhardt, 1837 (Northern sand lance)
 Ammodytes heian J. W. Orr, Wildes & Kai, 2015 (Peaceful sand lance) 
 Ammodytes hexapterus Pallas, 1814 (Arctic sand lance) 
 Ammodytes japonicus Duncker & Mohr (de), 1939 (Western sand lance) 
 Ammodytes marinus Raitt, 1934 (Lesser sand eel)
 Ammodytes personatus Girard, 1856 (Pacific sand lance) 
 Ammodytes tobianus Linnaeus, 1758 (Small sand eel)

References

Ammodytidae
Taxa named by Carl Linnaeus
Marine fish genera